Miami, officially the City of Miami, is a coastal metropolis and the seat of Miami-Dade County in South Florida. With a population of 442,241 as of the 2020 census, it is the second-most populous city in the state of Florida after Jacksonville. It is the core of the much larger Miami metropolitan area, which, with a population of 6.138 million, is the third-largest metro in the Southeast and ninth-largest in the United States. The city has the third largest skyline in the U.S. with over 300 high-rises, 58 of which exceed .

Miami is a major center and leader in finance, commerce, culture, arts, and international trade. Miami's metropolitan area is by far the largest urban economy in Florida, with a gross domestic product of $344.9 billion as of 2017. According to a 2018 UBS study of 77 world cities, Miami is the second richest city in the U.S. and the third richest globally in purchasing power. Miami is a majority-minority city with a Hispanic population of 310,472, or 70.2 percent of the city's population, as of 2020.

Downtown Miami has one of the largest concentrations of international banks in the U.S. and is home to several large national and international companies. The Health District is home to several major University of Miami-affiliated hospital and health facilities, including Jackson Memorial Hospital, the nation's largest hospital with 1,547 beds, and the Leonard M. Miller School of Medicine, the University of Miami's academic medical center and teaching hospital, and others engaged in health-related care and research. PortMiami, the city's seaport, is the busiest cruise port in the world in both passenger traffic and cruise lines. Miami is the second largest tourism hub for international visitors, after New York City. Miami has sometimes been called the Gateway to Latin America because of the magnitude of its commercial and cultural ties to the region.

In 2019, Miami ranked seventh in the U.S. in business activity, human capital, information exchange, cultural experience, and political engagement.

Toponymy
Miami was named in 1896 after the Miami River, derived from Mayaimi, the historic name of Lake Okeechobee and the Native Americans who lived around it. Miami is sometimes referred to as The 305, Magic City, Gateway to the Americas, Gateway to Latin America, Capital of Latin America and Vice City.

History

The Tequesta tribe occupied the Miami area for around 2,000 years before contact with Europeans. A village of hundreds of people, dating to 500–600 BCE, was located at the mouth of the Miami River. It is believed that the entire tribe migrated to Cuba by the mid-1700s.

Settlement
In 1566, admiral Pedro Menéndez de Avilés, Florida's first governor, claimed the area for Spain. A Spanish mission was constructed one year later. Spain and Britain successively ruled Florida until Spain ceded it to the United States in 1821. In 1836, the U.S. built Fort Dallas on the banks of the Miami River as part of their development of the Florida Territory and their attempt to suppress and remove the Seminoles. As a result, the Miami area became a site of fighting in the Second Seminole War.

Founding
Miami is noted as the only major city in the United States founded by a woman. Julia Tuttle, a local citrus grower and a wealthy Cleveland native, was the original owner of the land upon which the city was built. In the late 19th century, the area was known as "Biscayne Bay Country", and reports described it as a promising wilderness and "one of the finest building sites in Florida". The Great Freeze of 1894–1895 hastened Miami's growth, as the crops there were the only ones in Florida that survived. Julia Tuttle subsequently convinced railroad tycoon Henry Flagler to extend his Florida East Coast Railway to the region, for which she became known as "the mother of Miami". Miami was officially incorporated as a city on July 28, 1896, with a population of just over 300. African American labor played a crucial role in Miami's early development.

20th century

During the early 20th century, migrants from the Bahamas and African-Americans constituted 40 percent of the city's population. Despite their role in the city's growth, their community was limited to a small space. When landlords began to rent homes to African-Americans around Avenue J (what would later become NW Fifth Avenue), a gang of white men with torches marched through the neighborhood and warned the residents to move or be bombed.

Miami prospered during the 1920s with an increase in population and development in infrastructure as northerners moved to the city. The legacy of Jim Crow was embedded in these developments. Miami's chief of police at the time, H. Leslie Quigg, did not hide the fact that he, like many other white Miami police officers, was a member of the Ku Klux Klan. Unsurprisingly, these officers enforced social codes far beyond the written law. Quigg, for example, "personally and publicly beat a colored bellboy to death for speaking directly to a white woman".

The collapse of the Florida land boom of the 1920s, the 1926 Miami Hurricane, and the Great Depression in the 1930s slowed development. When World War II began, Miami became a base for U.S. defense against German submarines due to its prime location on the southern coast of Florida. This brought an increase in Miami's population; 172,172 people lived in the city by 1940. The city's nickname, The Magic City, came from its rapid growth, which was noticed by winter visitors who remarked that the city grew so much from one year to the next that it was like magic.

After Fidel Castro rose to power in Cuba following the Revolution in 1959, many wealthy Cubans sought refuge in Miami, further increasing the city's population. The city's national profile expanded dramatically in the 1970s, particularly in 1972. The region hosted both the Democratic and Republican National Conventions in the 1972 Presidential election. The Miami Dolphins also made history with their undefeated "perfect" season. The area's educational and cultural institutions had also developed significantly in this period, positioning the city to service a larger and increasingly international populace. Miami also developed new businesses and cultural amenities as part of the New South in the 1980s and 1990s. At the same time, South Florida weathered social problems related to drug wars, immigration from Haiti and Latin America, and the widespread destruction of Hurricane Andrew. Racial and cultural tensions sometimes sparked, but the city developed in the latter half of the 20th century as a major international, financial, and cultural center. It is the second-largest U.S. city with a Spanish-speaking majority (after El Paso, Texas), and the largest city with a Cuban-American plurality.

Geography
Miami and its suburbs are located on a broad plain between the Everglades to the west and Biscayne Bay to the east, which extends from Lake Okeechobee southward to Florida Bay. The highest points are found along the Miami Rock Ridge, which lies under most of the eastern Miami metro. The main portion of the city is on the shores of Biscayne Bay, which contains several hundred natural and artificial barrier islands, the largest of which contains Miami Beach and South Beach.

Geology
The surface bedrock under the Miami area is called Miami oolite or Miami limestone. Miami limestone formed as the result of the drastic changes in sea level associated with recent glacial periods, or ice ages. All of southern Florida was covered by a shallow sea. Several parallel lines of reef formed along the edge of the submerged Florida plateau, stretching from the present Miami area to what is now the Dry Tortugas. The area behind this reef line was, in fact, a large lagoon, and the Miami limestone formed throughout the area from the deposition of oolites and the shells of bryozoans. Starting about 100,000 years ago, the Wisconsin glaciation began lowering sea levels, exposing the floor of the lagoon. The sea level rose quickly after that, stabilizing at the current level about 4,000 years ago, leaving the mainland of South Florida just above sea level.

Beneath the plain lies the Biscayne Aquifer, a natural underground source of fresh water that extends from southern Palm Beach County to Florida Bay. It comes closest to the surface around the cities of Miami Springs and Hialeah. Most of the Miami metropolitan area obtains its drinking water from the Biscayne Aquifer. As a result of the aquifer, it is not possible to dig more than  beneath the city without hitting water, which impedes underground construction, though some underground parking garages exist. For this reason, the mass transit systems in and around Miami are elevated or at-grade.

Most of the western fringes of the city border the Everglades, a tropical marshland covering most of the southern portion of Florida. Alligators that live in the marshes have ventured into Miami communities and onto major highways.

Cityscape

Neighborhoods

Miami is split roughly into north, south, west, and Downtown areas. The heart of the city is Downtown Miami, which is on the eastern side and includes the neighborhoods of Brickell, Virginia Key, Watson Island, as well as PortMiami. Downtown Miami is Florida's largest and most influential central business district, with many major banks, courthouses, financial headquarters, cultural and tourist attractions, schools, parks, and a large residential population. Brickell Avenue has the largest concentration of international banks in the United States. Just northwest of Downtown is the Health District, which is Miami's center for hospitals, research institutes and biotechnology, with hospitals such as Jackson Memorial Hospital, Bascom Palmer Eye Institute, and the University of Miami's Leonard M. Miller School of Medicine.

The southern side of Miami includes the neighborhoods of Coral Way, The Roads, and Coconut Grove. Coral Way is a historic residential neighborhood built in 1922 between Downtown and Coral Gables, and is home to many old homes and tree-lined streets. Coconut Grove, established in 1825, is a historic neighborhood with narrow, winding roads and a heavy tree canopy. It is the location of Miami's City Hall at Dinner Key, the former Coconut Grove Playhouse, CocoWalk, and the Coconut Grove Convention Center. It is also home to many nightclubs, bars, restaurants, and bohemian shops, which makes it very popular with local college students. Coconut Grove is known for its many parks and gardens, such as Vizcaya Museum, The Kampong, The Barnacle Historic State Park, and numerous other historic homes and estates.

The western side of Miami includes the neighborhoods of Little Havana, West Flagler, and Flagami. Although at one time a mostly Jewish neighborhood, today western Miami is home to immigrants from mostly Central America and Cuba, while the west central neighborhood of Allapattah is a multicultural community of many ethnicities.

The northern side of Miami includes Midtown, a district with a great mix of diversity ranging from West Indians to Hispanics to European Americans. The Edgewater neighborhood of Midtown is mostly composed of high-rise residential towers and is home to the Adrienne Arsht Center for the Performing Arts. Wynwood is an art district with ten galleries in former warehouses, as well as a large outdoor mural project. The wealthier residents of Miami usually live in the Design District and the Upper Eastside, which has many 1920s homes as well as examples of Miami Modern architecture in the MiMo Historic District. The northern side of Miami also has notable African-American and Caribbean immigrant communities, including Little Haiti, Overtown (home of the Lyric Theater), and Liberty City.

Climate

Miami has a tropical monsoon climate (Köppen climate classification Am) with hot and wet summers and warm and dry winters.

The city's sea-level elevation, coastal location, position just above the Tropic of Cancer, and proximity to the Gulf Stream shape its climate. Low temperatures fall below  about 3 to 4 nights during the winter season, after the passage of cold fronts that produce what little rainfall that falls in the winter.

There are two basic seasons in Miami, a hot and wet season from May through October, and a warm and dry season from November through April. During the hot and wet season, daily thundershowers occur in the humid unstable air masses. The wet season in Miami is defined as the period during which the average daily dew point temperature is above . The rainy season typically begins on the first day that occurs, or within a few days later. During the years 1956 to 1997, the date summer began ranged from April 16 to June 3, with a median date of May 21. During those same years, the date summer ended ranged from September 24 to November 1, with a median date of October 17. During the summer, temperatures range from the mid-80s to low 90s °F (29–35 °C) and are accompanied by high humidity, though the heat is often relieved in the afternoon by thunderstorms or a sea breeze that develops off the Atlantic Ocean. Much of the year's  of rainfall occurs during this period.

While Miami has never recorded snowfall at any official weather station since records have been kept, snow flurries fell in some parts of the city on January 19, 1977. The stability of summer overnight lows is underlined by the mean maximum annual overnight low is just one degree lower.

Hurricane season officially runs from June 1 through November 30, although hurricanes can develop beyond those dates. The most likely time for Miami to be hit is during the peak of the Cape Verde season, which is mid-August through the end of September. Although tornadoes are uncommon in the area, one struck in 1925 and another in 1997. Around 40% of homes in Miami are built upon floodplains and are considered as flood-risk zones.

Miami falls under the Department of Agriculture's 10b/11a plant hardiness zone.

Miami is one of the major coastal cities and major cities in the United States that will be most affected by climate change. Globally, it is one of the most at-risk cities as well, according to a 2020 report by Resources for the Future. Other potential impacts of climate change include higher hurricane wind speeds and severe thunderstorms, which can bring about hail or tornadoes. Some protective efforts are in place, including nourishing beaches and adding protective barriers, raising buildings and roads that are vulnerable, and restoring natural habitats such as wetlands. Miami Beach has invested $500 million to protect roads, buildings, and water systems. Real estate prices in Miami already reflect the increase in prices for real estate at a higher elevation within the city compared to real estate at a lower elevation.

Demographics

The city is home to less than one-thirteenth of the population of South Florida. Miami is the 44th most populous city in the United States. The Miami metropolitan area, which includes Miami-Dade, Broward, and Palm Beach counties, has a population of 6.1 million people, ranking eighth in the United States. 

In 1960, people of Hispanic origin made up about 5% of the population of Miami-Dade County. Between 1960 and 2000, Hispanics accounted for 90% of the population growth in the county, and their share of the county's population grew to more than 57% by 2000.

In 1970, the Census Bureau reported Miami's population as 45% Hispanic, 41.7% non-Hispanic white, and 22.7% black. Miami's explosive population growth has been driven by internal migration from other parts of the country, primarily up until the 1980s, as well as by immigration, primarily from the 1960s to the 1990s. Today, immigration to Miami has continued and Miami's growth today is attributed greatly to its fast urbanization and high-rise construction, which has increased its inner city neighborhood population densities, such as in Downtown, Brickell, and Edgewater, where one area in Downtown alone saw a 2,069% increase in population in the 2010 Census. Miami is regarded as more of a multicultural mosaic, than it is a melting pot, with residents still maintaining much of, or some of their cultural traits. The overall culture of Miami is heavily influenced by its large population from the Caribbean and South America.

Culture

Miami has a minority-majority population, as non-Hispanic whites comprised only 11.5% of the total. As of the 2020 census, the racial makeup of the population of Miami was 65.4% White American (including White Hispanic), 16.0% black or African American, 1.3% Asian American, and the remainder belonged to other groups or was of mixed ancestry. The 2020 US Census reported that Hispanic or Latino residents of any race made up 72.5% of Miami's population.

In 2010, 34.4% of city residents were of Cuban origin, 15.8% had a Central American background (7.2% Nicaraguan, 5.8% Honduran, 1.2% Salvadoran, and 1.0% Guatemalan), 8.7% were of South American descent (3.2% Colombian, 1.4% Venezuelan, 1.2% Peruvian, 1.2% Argentine, 1.0% Chilean and 0.7% Ecuadorian), 4.0% had other Hispanic or Latino origins (0.5% Spaniard), 3.2% descended from Puerto Ricans, 2.4% were Dominican, and 1.5% had Mexican ancestry.

, 5.6% of city residents were West Indian or Afro-Caribbean American origin (4.4% Haitian, 0.4% Jamaican, 0.4% Bahamian, 0.1% British West Indian, and 0.1% Trinidadian and Tobagonian, 0.1% Other or Unspecified West Indian), 3.0% were Black Hispanics, and 0.4% were Subsaharan African origin.

, those of (non-Hispanic white) European ancestry accounted for 11.9% of Miami's population. Of the city's total population, 1.7% were German, 1.6% Italian, 1.4% Irish, 1.0% English, 0.8% French, 0.6% Russian, and 0.5% were Polish. Since the 1960s, there has been massive white flight with many non-Hispanic whites moving outside Miami due to the influx of immigrants settling in most parts of Miami.

, those of Asian ancestry accounted for 1.0% of Miami's population. Of the city's total population, 0.3% were Indian/Indo-Caribbean (1,206 people), 0.3% Chinese/Chinese Caribbean (1,804 people), 0.2% Filipino (647 people), 0.1% were other Asian (433 people), 0.1% Japanese (245 people), 0.1% Korean (213 people), and 0.0% were Vietnamese (125 people).

In 2010, 1.9% of the population considered themselves to be of only American ancestry (regardless of race or ethnicity), while 0.5% were of Arab ancestry, .

According to a 2014 study by the Pew Research Center, Christianity is the most-practiced religion in Miami (68%), with 39% professing attendance at a variety of churches that could be considered Protestant, and 27% professing Catholicism. Followed by Judaism (9%); Islam, Buddhism, Hinduism, and a variety of other religions have smaller followings; atheism or no self-identifying organized religious affiliation was practiced by 21%.

There has been a Norwegian Seamen's church in Miami since the early 1980s. In November 2011, Crown Princess of Norway Mette-Marit opened a new building for the church. The church was built as a center for the 10,000 Scandinavians that live in Florida. Around 4,000 of them are Norwegian. The church is also an important place for the 150 Norwegians that work at Walt Disney World in Central Florida.

, a total of 74.7% of Miami's population age five and over spoke a language other than English at home; 66.3% of Miami residents spoke Spanish at home, 7.1% other Indo-European languages, 0.9% Asian and Pacific Islander languages, and 0.7% other.

Other demographics
As of the 2020 United States census, 81.8% of people over age 25 were a high school graduate or higher, while 30.7% had a bachelor's degree or higher.

There were 1,074,685 housing units, of which 902,200 were households; 43.7% were married-couple families, 31.2% had a female householder with a family and no spouse, and 18.0% had a male householder with the same. The average family size was 3.3. 20.2% of people were under the age of 18, while 16.9% were over 65.

In 2020, 53.6% of the county's population was foreign-born, with 59% being naturalized American citizens.

About 14.9% of the population was below the poverty line at the census, including 21.1% of those under age 18 and 20.8% of those aged 65 or over.

According to the 2022 Point-In-Time Homeless Count, there were 3,440 homeless people in Miami, 970 of which were on the streets.

Economy

Miami is a major center of commerce and finance and boasts a strong international business community. According to the 2020 ranking of world cities undertaken by the Globalization and World Cities Research Network (GaWC) based on the level of presence of global corporate service organizations, Miami is considered a Beta + level world city, along with Atlanta, Dallas, and Houston, however according to the US census between the years 2015–2019, Miami lacks in terms of owner-occupied housing, computer and internet usage, education regarding bachelor's degree or higher, median household income, per capita income, while achieving higher percentage of persons in poverty. Miami has a Gross Metropolitan Product of $257 billion, ranking 11th in the United States and 20th worldwide in GMP.

Several large companies are headquartered in Miami, including but not limited to Akerman LLP, Alienware, Arquitectonica, Brightstar Corporation, Celebrity Cruises, Carnival Corporation, Duany Plater-Zyberk, Greenberg Traurig, Inktel Direct, Lennar Corporation, Norwegian Cruise Line, Oceania Cruises, OPKO Health, Parkjockey, RCTV International, Royal Caribbean International, Sitel, Southern Wine & Spirits, Telemundo, Vector Group, Watsco and World Fuel Services. Over 1,400 multinational firms are located in Miami, with many major global organisations headquartering their Latin American operations (or regional offices) in the city including Walmart. Additionally, companies based in nearby cities or unincorporated areas of Miami-Dade County include, Benihana, Burger King, Carnival Cruise Line, Navarro Discount Pharmacies, Perry Ellis International, Ryder, Sedano's, UniMás, and U.S. Century Bank.

Miami is a major television production center, and the most important city in the United States for Spanish language media. Telemundo and UniMás have their headquarters in the Miami area. Univisión Studios and Telemundo Studios produce much of the original programming for their respective parent networks, such as telenovelas, news, sports, and talk shows. In 2011, 85% of Telemundo's original programming was filmed in Miami. Miami is also a significant music recording center, with the Sony Music Latin headquarters in the city, along with many other smaller record labels. The city also attracts many artists for music video and film shoots.

During the mid-2000s, the city witnessed its largest real estate boom since the Florida land boom of the 1920s, and the city had well over a hundred approved high-rise construction projects. However, only 50 were actually built. Rapid high-rise construction led to fast population growth in the Miami's inner neighborhoods, with Downtown, Brickell and Edgewater becoming the fastest-growing areas of the city. The city currently has the seven tallest (as well as fifteen of top twenty) skyscrapers in the state of Florida, with the tallest being the  Panorama Tower.

The housing market crash of 2007 caused a foreclosure crisis in the area. Like other metro areas in the United States, crime in Miami is localized to specific neighborhoods. In a 2016 study by the website 24/7 Wall Street, Miami was rated as the worst U.S. city in which to live, based on crime, poverty, income inequality, education, and housing costs that far exceed the national median.

Miami International Airport (MIA) and PortMiami are among the nation's busiest ports of entry, especially for cargo from South America and the Caribbean. PortMiami is the world's busiest cruise port, and MIA is the busiest airport in Florida and the largest gateway between the United States and Latin America. Due to its strength in international business, finance and trade, the city has among the largest concentration of international banks in the country, primarily along Brickell Avenue in Brickell, Miami's financial district. Miami was the host city of the 2003 Free Trade Area of the Americas negotiations.

Miami is the home to the National Hurricane Center and the headquarters of the United States Southern Command, responsible for military operations in Central and South America. Miami is also an industrial center, especially for stone quarrying and warehousing. These industries are centered largely on the western fringes of the city near Doral and Hialeah.

According to the U.S. Census Bureau in 2012, Miami had the fourth highest percentage of family incomes below the federal poverty line out of all large cities in the United States, behind Detroit, Michigan, Cleveland, Ohio, and Cincinnati, Ohio, respectively. Miami is also one of the very few cities in the U.S. where the local government has gone bankrupt, in 2001.

The Little Fire Ant (Wasmannia auropunctata) is an invasive agricultural pest here.

PortMiami

Miami is home to one of the largest ports in the United States, the PortMiami. It is the largest cruise ship port in the world, and is often called the "Cruise Capital of the World" and the "Cargo Gateway of the Americas". It has retained its status as the number one cruise/passenger port in the world for well over a decade, accommodating the largest cruise ships and the major cruise lines. In 2017, the port served 5,340,559 cruise passengers. Additionally, the port is one of the nation's busiest cargo ports, importing 9,162,340 tons of cargo in 2017. Among North American ports, it ranks second to New Orleans' Port of South Louisiana in cargo tonnage imported from Latin America. China is the port's number one import country and number one export country. Miami has the world's largest amount of cruise line headquarters, home to Carnival Cruise Line, Celebrity Cruises, Norwegian Cruise Line, Oceania Cruises, and Royal Caribbean International. In 2014, the Port of Miami Tunnel was opened, connecting the MacArthur Causeway to PortMiami.

Tourism and conventions

Tourism is one of the Miami's largest private-sector industries, accounting for more than 144,800 jobs in Miami-Dade County. The city's frequent portrayal in music, film, and popular culture has made the city and its landmarks recognizable worldwide. In 2016, it attracted the second-highest number of foreign tourists of any city in the United States, after New York City, and is among the top 20 cities worldwide by international visitor spending. More than 15.9 million visitors arrived in Miami in 2017, adding $26.1 billion to the economy. With a large hotel infrastructure and the newly renovated Miami Beach Convention Center, Miami is a popular destination for annual conventions and conferences.

Some of the most popular tourist destinations in Miami include South Beach, Lincoln Road, Bayside Marketplace, Downtown Miami, and Brickell City Centre. The Art Deco District in Miami Beach is reputed as one of the most glamorous in the world for its nightclubs, beaches, historical buildings, and shopping. Annual events such as the Miami Open, Art Basel, the Winter Music Conference, the South Beach Wine and Food Festival, and Mercedes-Benz Fashion Week Miami attract millions to the metropolis every year.

Culture

Miami enjoys a vibrant culture that is influenced by a diverse population from all around the world. Miami is known as the "Magic City" for seemingly popping up overnight due to its young age, massive growth, and its aesthetics of neon art deco. The city itself is infamous for its drug war in the early 1980s and its outrun aesthetics. It is also nicknamed the "Capital of Latin America" because of its high population of Spanish-speakers.

Miami has been the setting of numerous films and television shows, including Miami Vice, Cocaine Cowboys, Burn Notice, Jane the Virgin, Scarface, The Birdcage, Ace Ventura: Pet Detective, The Golden Girls, 2 Fast 2 Furious, and Dexter. Several video games, including Hotline Miami, the Gameloft racing game Asphalt Overdrive, Scarface: The World Is Yours, and the fictional Vice City in several video games across the Grand Theft Auto series, most notably Grand Theft Auto: Vice City, is based on Miami.

Entertainment and performing arts

In addition to annual festivals like the Calle Ocho Festival, Miami is home to many entertainment venues, theaters, museums, parks and performing arts centers. The newest addition to the Miami arts scene is the Adrienne Arsht Center for the Performing Arts, home of the Florida Grand Opera and the second-largest performing arts center in the United States after Lincoln Center in New York City. The center attracts many large-scale operas, ballets, concerts, and musicals from around the world. Other performing arts venues in Miami include the Olympia Theater, Wertheim Performing Arts Center, the Fair Expo Center, the Tower Theater, and the Bayfront Park Amphitheater.

Another celebrated event is the Miami International Film Festival, taking place every year for 10 days around the first week of March, during which independent international and American films are screened across the city. Miami has over a half dozen independent film theaters.

Miami attracts a large number of musicians, singers, actors, dancers, and orchestral players. The city has numerous orchestras, symphonies and performing art conservatories. These include the Florida Grand Opera, FIU School of Music, Frost School of Music, and the New World School of the Arts.

Miami is also a major fashion center, home to models and some of the top modeling agencies in the world. The city is host to many fashion shows and events, including the annual Miami Fashion Week and the Mercedes-Benz Fashion Week Miami, held in the Wynwood Art District.

Miami will be having their first boat-in movie theater on Saturday, July 25, 2020.

Museums and visual arts

Some of the museums in Miami include the Frost Art Museum, Frost Museum of Science, HistoryMiami, Institute of Contemporary Art, Miami Children's Museum, Pérez Art Museum, Lowe Art Museum, and the Vizcaya Museum and Gardens, a National Historic Landmark set on a 28-acre early 20th century estate in Coconut Grove.

Cuisine

The cuisine of Miami is a reflection of its diverse population, with a heavy influence from Caribbean and Latin American cuisine. By combining the two with American cuisine, it has spawned a unique South Florida style of cooking known as Floribbean cuisine. It is widely available throughout Miami and South Florida and can be found in restaurant chains such as Pollo Tropical.

Cuban immigrants in the 1960s originated the Cuban sandwich and brought medianoche, Cuban espresso, Bistec de palomilla, and croquetas, all of which have grown in popularity among all Miamians and have become symbols of the city's varied cuisine. Today, these are part of the local culture and can be found throughout the city at window cafés, particularly outside of supermarkets and restaurants. Some of these locations, such as the Versailles restaurant in Little Havana, are landmark eateries of Miami. Located on the Atlantic Ocean, and with a long history as a seaport, Miami is also known for its seafood, with many seafood restaurants located along the Miami River and in and around Biscayne Bay. The city is also the headquarters of restaurant chains such as Burger King and Benihana.

Dialect

The Miami area has a unique dialect, commonly called the "Miami accent", that is widely spoken. The accent developed among second- or third-generation Hispanics, including Cuban Americans, whose first language was English (though some non-Hispanic white, black, and other races who were born and raised in the Miami area tend to adopt it as well). It is based on a fairly standard American accent but with some changes, very similar to dialects in the Mid-Atlantic (especially those in the New York area and Northern New Jersey, including New York Latino English). Unlike Virginia Piedmont, Coastal Southern American, Northeast American dialects and Florida Cracker dialect, "Miami accent" is rhotic; it also incorporates a rhythm and pronunciation heavily influenced by Spanish (wherein rhythm is syllable-timed).

Sports

 

Miami's main five sports teams are Inter Miami CF of Major League Soccer (MLS), the Miami Dolphins of the National Football League (NFL), the Miami Heat of the National Basketball Association (NBA), the Miami Marlins of Major League Baseball (MLB), and the Florida Panthers of the National Hockey League (NHL). The Miami Open, an annual tennis tournament, was previously held in Key Biscayne before moving to Hard Rock Stadium after the tournament was purchased by Miami Dolphins owner Stephen Ross in 2019. The city is home to numerous marinas, jai alai venues, and golf courses. The city streets have hosted professional auto races in the past, most notably the open-wheel Grand Prix of Miami, the sports car Grand Prix of Miami, and Miami Grand Prix of Formula One. The Homestead-Miami Speedway oval hosts NASCAR races.

The Heat and the Marlins play within Miami's city limits, at the Miami-Dade Arena in Downtown and LoanDepot Park in Little Havana, respectively. Marlins Park is built on the site of the old Miami Orange Bowl stadium.

The Miami Dolphins play at Hard Rock Stadium in suburban Miami Gardens, while the Florida Panthers play in nearby Sunrise at the FLA Live Arena. Inter Miami CF plays at DRV PNK Stadium in nearby Fort Lauderdale, temporarily until a stadium is built in Miami. Miami FC is another professional  soccer club that plays in the USL Championship second tier of US Professional soccer. The Club plays it's home matches at the Riccardo Silva Stadium  on the campus of Florida International University (FIU) in Miami.  

The Orange Bowl, one of the major bowl games in the College Football Playoff of the NCAA, is played at Hard Rock Stadium every winter. The stadium has also hosted the Super Bowl; the Miami metro area has hosted the game a total of ten times (five times at the current Hard Rock Stadium and five at the Miami Orange Bowl), tying New Orleans for the most games.

Miami is also the home of many college sports teams. The two largest are the University of Miami Hurricanes, whose football team plays at Hard Rock Stadium and Florida International University Panthers, whose football team plays at Ricardo Silva Stadium. The Hurricanes compete in the Atlantic Coast Conference (ACC), while the Panthers compete in the Conference USA of the National Collegiate Athletic Association.

Miami is also home to Paso Fino horses, and competitions are held at Tropical Park Equestrian Center.

Miami will serve as one of eleven US host cities for the 2026 FIFA World Cup.

The following are the major professional sports teams in the Miami metropolitan area:

Beaches and parks

The City of Miami has various lands operated by the National Park Service, the Florida Division of Recreation and Parks, and the City of Miami Department of Parks and Recreation.

Miami's tropical weather allows for year-round outdoor activities. The city has numerous marinas, rivers, bays, canals, and the Atlantic Ocean, which make boating, canoeing, sailing, and fishing popular outdoor activities. Biscayne Bay has numerous coral reefs that make snorkeling and scuba diving popular. There are over 80 parks and gardens in the city. The largest and most popular parks are Bayfront Park and Museum Park (located in the heart of Downtown and the location of the Miami-Dade Arena and Bayside Marketplace), Tropical Park, Peacock Park, Virginia Key, and Watson Island.

Other popular cultural destinations in or near Miami include Zoo Miami, Jungle Island, the Miami Seaquarium, Monkey Jungle, Coral Castle, Charles Deering Estate, Fairchild Tropical Botanic Garden, and Key Biscayne.

In its 2020 ParkScore ranking, The Trust for Public Land reported that the park system in the City of Miami was the 64th best park system among the 100 most populous US cities, down slightly from 48th place in the 2017 ranking. The City of Miami was analyzed to have a median park size of 2.6 acres, park land as percent of city area of 6.5%, 87% of residents living within a 10-minute walk of a park, $48.39 spending per capita of park services, and 1.3 playgrounds per 10,000 residents.

Law and government

The government of the City of Miami uses the mayor-commissioner type of system. The city commission consists of five commissioners that are elected from single member districts. The city commission constitutes the governing body with powers to pass ordinances, adopt regulations, and exercise all powers conferred upon the city in the city charter. The mayor is elected at large and appoints a city manager. The City of Miami is governed by Mayor Francis X. Suarez and 5 city commissioners that oversee the five districts in the city. The commission's regular meetings are held at Miami City Hall, which is located at 3500 Pan American Drive on Dinner Key in the neighborhood of Coconut Grove. In the United States House of Representatives, Miami is represented by Republicans Maria Elvira Salazar and Mario Diaz-Balart, along with Democrat Frederica Wilson.

City Commission

 Francis X. Suarez – Mayor of the City of Miami
 Alex Diaz de la Portilla – Miami Commissioner, District 1
Allapattah and Grapeland Heights
 Sabina Covo – Miami Commissioner, District 2
Arts & Entertainment District, Brickell, Coconut Grove, Coral Way, Downtown Miami, Edgewater, Midtown Miami, Park West and the South part Upper Eastside
 Joe Carollo – Miami Commissioner, District 3
Coral Way, Little Havana and The Roads
 Manolo Reyes – Miami Commissioner, District 4
Coral Way, Flagami and West Flagler
 Christine King – Miami Commissioner, District 5
Buena Vista, Design District, Liberty City, Little Haiti, Little River, Lummus Park, Overtown, Spring Garden and Wynwood and northern part of the Upper Eastside 
 Arthur Noriega – City Manager
 Victoria Méndez – City Attorney
 Todd B. Hannon – City Clerk

Education

Colleges and universities

Miami-Dade County has over 200,000 students enrolled in local colleges and universities, placing it seventh in the nation in per capita university enrollment. In 2010, the city's four largest colleges and universities, Miami Dade College, Florida International University, University of Miami, and Barry University, graduated 28,000 students.

Miami is also home to both for-profit and nonprofit organizations that offer a range of professional training and other, related educational programs. Per Scholas, for example is a nonprofit organization that offers free professional certification training directed towards successfully passing CompTIA A+ and Network+ certification exams as a route to securing jobs and building careers.

Colleges and universities in and around Miami:
 Barry University (private)
 Broward College (public)
 Carlos Albizu University (private)
 Florida Atlantic University (public)
 Florida International University (public)
 Florida Memorial University (private)
 Keiser University (private)
 Manchester Business School (satellite location, UK public)
 Miami Culinary Institute (public)
 Miami Dade College (public)
 Miami International University of Art & Design (private)
 Nova Southeastern University (private)
 Palm Beach State College (public)
 St. Thomas University (private)
 Southeastern College (private)
 Talmudic University (private)
 University of Miami (private)

Primary and secondary schools
 

Public schools in Miami are governed by Miami-Dade County Public Schools, which is the largest school district in Florida and the fourth-largest in the United States. As of September 2008 it has a student enrollment of 385,655 and over 392 schools and centers. The district is also the largest minority public school system in the country, with 60% of its students being of Hispanic origin, 28% Black or West Indian American, 10% White (non-Hispanic) and 2% non-white of other minorities.

Miami is home to some of the nation's best high schools, such as Design and Architecture High School, ranked the nation's best magnet school, MAST Academy, Coral Reef High School, ranked 20th-best public high school in the U.S., Miami Palmetto High School, and the New World School of the Arts. M-DCPS is also one of a few public school districts in the United States to offer optional bilingual education in Spanish, French, German, Haitian Creole, and Mandarin Chinese.

Miami is home to several well-known Roman Catholic, Jewish and non-denominational private schools. The Archdiocese of Miami operates the city's Catholic private schools, which include St. Hugh Catholic School, St. Agatha Catholic School, St. Theresa School, Immaculata-Lasalle High School, Monsignor Edward Pace High School, Archbishop Curley-Notre Dame High School, St. Brendan High School, among numerous other Catholic elementary and high schools.

Catholic preparatory schools operated by religious orders are Belen Jesuit Preparatory School and Christopher Columbus High School for boys and Carrollton School of the Sacred Heart and Our Lady of Lourdes Academy for girls.

Non-denominational private schools in Miami are Ransom Everglades, Gulliver Preparatory School, and Miami Country Day School. Other schools in the area include Samuel Scheck Hillel Community Day School, Dade Christian School, Palmer Trinity School, Westminster Christian School, and Riviera Schools.

Supplementary education
The Miami Hoshuko, is a part-time Japanese school for Japanese citizens and ethnic Japanese people in the area. Previously it was located on Virginia Key, at the Rosenstiel School of Marine and Atmospheric Science. Currently the school holds classes in Westchester and has offices in Doral.

Media

Miami has one of the largest television markets in the nation and the second largest in the state of Florida after Tampa Bay. Miami has several major newspapers, the main and largest newspaper being The Miami Herald. El Nuevo Herald is the major and largest Spanish-language newspaper. The Miami Herald and El Nuevo Herald are Miami's and South Florida's main, major and largest newspapers. The papers left their longtime home in Downtown Miami in 2013. The newspapers are now headquartered at the former home of U.S. Southern Command in Doral.

Other major newspapers include Miami Today, headquartered in Brickell, Miami New Times, headquartered in Midtown, Miami SunPost, South Florida Business Journal, and The Miami Times. An additional Spanish-language newspaper, Diario Las Americas also serves Miami. Student newspapers from the local universities include the University of Miami's The Miami Hurricane, Florida International University's The Beacon, Miami-Dade College's The Metropolis, and Barry University's The Buccaneer. 

A number of magazines circulate throughout the greater Miami area, including Miami Monthly, Southeast Florida's only city/regional, and Ocean Drive, a hot-spot social scene glossy.

Miami is also the headquarters and main production city of many of the world's largest television networks, record label companies, broadcasting companies and production facilities, such as Telemundo, Univision, Univision Communications, Mega TV, Universal Music Latin Entertainment, RCTV International and Sunbeam Television. In 2009, Univision announced plans to build a new production studio in Miami, dubbed Univision Studios. Univision Studios is currently headquartered in Miami, and will produce programming for all of Univision Communications' television networks.

Miami is the twelfth largest radio market and the seventeenth largest television market in the United States. Television stations serving the Miami area include WAMI (UniMás), WBFS (Independent), WSFL (The CW), WFOR (CBS O&O), WHFT (TBN), WLTV (Univision), WPLG (ABC), WPXM (Ion), WSCV (Telemundo), WSVN (Fox), WTVJ (NBC O&O), WPBT (PBS), and WLRN (also PBS).

Transportation

According to the 2016 American Community Survey, 72.3% of working city of Miami residents commuted by driving alone, 8.7% carpooled, 9% used public transportation, and 3.7% walked. About 1.8% used all other forms of transportation, including taxicab, motorcycle, and bicycle. About 4.5% of working city of Miami residents worked at home. In 2015, 19.9% of city of Miami households were without a car, which decreased to 18.6% in 2016. The national average was 8.7 percent in 2016. Miami averaged 1.24 cars per household in 2016, compared to a national average of 1.8 per household.

Expressways and roads

Miami's road system is based along the numerical Miami grid where Flagler Street forms the east–west baseline and Miami Avenue forms the north–south meridian. The corner of Flagler Street and Miami Avenue is in the middle of Downtown in front of the Downtown Macy's (formerly the Burdine's headquarters). The Miami grid is primarily numerical so that, for example, all street addresses north of Flagler Street and west of Miami Avenue have "NW" in their address. Because its point of origin is in Downtown, which is close to the coast, the "NW" and "SW" quadrants are much larger than the "SE" and "NE" quadrants. Many roads, especially major ones, are also named (e.g., Tamiami Trail/SW 8th St), although, with exceptions, the number is in more common usage among locals.

With few exceptions, within this grid north–south roads are designated as Courts, Roads, Avenues or Places (often remembered by their acronym), while east–west roads are Streets, Terraces, Drives or occasionally Ways. Major roads in each direction are located at one mile intervals. There are 16 blocks to each mile on north–south avenues, and 10 blocks to each mile on east–west streets. Major north–south avenues generally end in "7" – e.g., 17th, 27th, 37th/Douglas Aves., 57th/Red Rd., 67th/Ludlam, 87th/Galloway, etc., all the way west beyond 177th/Krome Avenue. (One prominent exception is 42nd Avenue, LeJeune Road, located at the half-mile point instead.) Major east–west streets to the south of Downtown are multiples of 16, though the beginning point of this system is at SW 8th St, one half-mile south of Flagler ("zeroth") Street. Thus, major streets are at 8th St., 24th St./Coral Way, 40th St./Bird, 56th/Miller, 72nd/ Sunset, 88th/N. Kendall, 104th (originally S. Kendall), 120th/Montgomery, 136th/Howard, 152nd/Coral Reef, 168th/Richmond, 184th/Eureka, 200th/Quail Roost, 216th/Hainlin Mill, 232nd/Silver Palm, 248th/Coconut Palm, etc., well into the 300s. Within the grid, odd-numbered addresses are generally on the north or east side, and even-numbered addresses are on the south or west side.

All streets and avenues in Miami-Dade County follow the Miami grid, with a few exceptions, most notably in Coral Gables, Hialeah, Coconut Grove and Miami Beach. One neighborhood, The Roads, is named as such because its streets run off the Miami grid at a 45-degree angle, and therefore are all named roads.

Miami-Dade County is served by four Interstate Highways (I-75, I-95, I-195, I-395) and several U.S. Highways including U.S. Route 1, U.S. Route 27, U.S. Route 41, and U.S. Route 441.

Some of the major Florida State Roads (and their common names) serving Miami are:
 SR 112 (Airport Expressway): Interstate 95 to MIA
 Homestead Extension of Florida's Turnpike (SR 821): Florida's Turnpike mainline (SR 91)/Miami Gardens to U.S. Route 1/Florida City
 SR 826 (Palmetto Expressway): Golden Glades Interchange to U.S. Route 1/Pinecrest
 SR 836 (Dolphin Expressway): Downtown to SW 137th Ave via MIA
 SR 874 (Don Shula Expressway): 826/Bird Road to Homestead Extension of Florida's Turnpike/Kendall
 SR 878 (Snapper Creek Expressway): SR 874/Kendall to U.S. Route 1/Pinecrest & South Miami
 SR 924 (Gratigny Parkway) Miami Lakes to Opa-locka

Miami has six major causeways that span over Biscayne Bay connecting the western mainland, with the eastern barrier islands along the Atlantic Ocean. The Rickenbacker Causeway is the southernmost causeway and connects Brickell to Virginia Key and Key Biscayne. The Venetian Causeway and MacArthur Causeway connect Downtown with South Beach. The Julia Tuttle Causeway connects Midtown and Miami Beach. The 79th Street Causeway connects the Upper East Side with North Beach. The northernmost causeway, the Broad Causeway, is the smallest of Miami's six causeways and connects North Miami to Bay Harbor Islands and Bal Harbour.

In 2007, Miami was identified as having the rudest drivers in the United States, the second year in a row to have been cited, in a poll commissioned by automobile club AutoVantage. Miami is also consistently ranked as one of the most dangerous cities in the United States for pedestrians.

Public transportation

Public transportation in Miami is operated by Miami-Dade Transit and SFRTA, and includes commuter rail (Tri-Rail), heavy-rail rapid transit (Metrorail), an elevated people mover (Metromover), and buses (Metrobus). Miami has Florida's highest transit ridership as about 17% of Miamians use transit on a daily basis. The average Miami public transit commute on weekdays is 90 minutes, while 39% of public transit riders commute for more than 2 hours a day. The average wait time at a public transit stop or station is 18 minutes, while 37% of riders wait for more than 20 minutes on average every day.

Miami's heavy-rail rapid transit system, Metrorail, is an elevated system comprising two lines and 23 stations on a -long line. Metrorail connects the urban western suburbs of Hialeah, Medley, and inner-city Miami with suburban The Roads, Coconut Grove, Coral Gables, South Miami, and urban Kendall via the central business districts of Miami International Airport, the Health District, and Downtown. A free, elevated people mover, Metromover, operates 21 stations on three different lines in greater Downtown Miami, with a station at roughly every two blocks of Downtown and Brickell. Several expansion projects are being funded by a transit development sales tax surcharge throughout Miami-Dade County.

Tri-Rail, a commuter rail system operated by the South Florida Regional Transportation Authority (SFRTA), runs from Miami International Airport northward to West Palm Beach, making eighteen stops throughout Miami-Dade, Broward, and Palm Beach counties.

The Miami Intermodal Center is a massive transportation hub servicing Metrorail, Amtrak, Tri-Rail, Metrobus, Greyhound Lines, taxis, rental cars, MIA Mover, private automobiles, bicycles and pedestrians adjacent to Miami International Airport. Miami Intermodal Center was completed in 2010, and is serving about 150,000 commuters and travelers in the Miami area. Phase I of MiamiCentral Station was completed in 2012, and the Tri-Rail part of Phase II was completed in 2015, but the construction of the Amtrak part remains delayed.

Two new light rail systems, Baylink and the Miami Streetcar, have been proposed and are currently in the planning stage. BayLink would connect Downtown with South Beach, and the Miami Streetcar would connect Downtown with Midtown.

Miami is the southern terminus of Amtrak's Atlantic Coast services, running two lines, the Silver Meteor and the Silver Star, both terminating in New York City. The Miami Amtrak Station is located in the suburb of Hialeah near the Tri-Rail/Metrorail Station on NW 79 St and NW 38 Ave. Current construction of the Miami Central Station will move all Amtrak operations from its current out-of-the-way location to a centralized location with Metrorail, MIA Mover, Tri-Rail, Miami International Airport, and the Miami Intermodal Center all within the same station closer to Downtown. The station was expected to be completed by 2012, but experienced several delays and was later expected to be completed in late 2014, again pushed back to early 2015.

Airports

Miami International Airport serves as the primary international airport of the Greater Miami Area. One of the busiest international airports in the world because of its centric location, Miami International Airport caters to over 45 million passengers a year. The airport is a major hub and the largest international gateway for American Airlines. Miami International is the second busiest airport by passenger traffic in Florida, the United States' third-largest international port of entry for foreign air passengers behind New York's John F. Kennedy International Airport and Los Angeles International Airport. The airport's extensive international route network includes non-stop flights to over seventy international cities in North and South America, Europe, Africa, Asia, and the Middle East.

Alternatively, nearby Fort Lauderdale–Hollywood International Airport and Palm Beach International Airport also serve commercial traffic in the Miami area. Miami-Opa Locka Executive Airport in Opa-locka and Miami Executive Airport in an unincorporated area southwest of Miami serve general aviation traffic in the Miami area.

Cycling and walking
The city government under former mayor Manny Diaz took an ambitious stance in support of bicycling in Miami for both recreation and commuting. In 2010, Miami was ranked as the 44th-most bike-friendly city in the US according to Bicycling Magazine.

A 2011 study by Walk Score ranked Miami the eighth-most walkable of the fifty largest cities in the U.S.

Public safety

International relations

Sister cities

 Agadir, Morocco (since 1995) 
 Barranquilla, Colombia (since 2015)
 Bogotá, Colombia (since 1971)
 Buenos Aires, Argentina (since 1979)
 Kagoshima, Japan (since 1990)
 Kaohsiung, Taiwan (since 1987) 
 Lima, Peru (since 1977)
 Madrid, Spain (since 2014)
 Murcia, Spain (since 1993) 
 Nice, France (since 1986) 
 Palermo, Italy (since 1997)
 Qingdao, China (since 2005)
 Salvador da Bahia, Brazil (since 2006)
 San Salvador, El Salvador (since 1991)
 Santiago, Chile (since 1986)
 Santo Domingo, Dominican Republic (since 1987)
 Southampton, United Kingdom (since 2019)

Cooperation agreements
 Lisbon, Portugal
 Yeruham, Israel

Notable people

Notes

References

Further reading
 Elizabeth M. Aranda, Sallie Hughes, and Elena Sabogal, Making a Life in Multiethnic Miami: Immigration and the Rise of a Global City. Boulder, Colorado: Renner, 2014.

External links

 City of Miami – official site
 Greater Miami Convention and Visitors Bureau

 
1825 establishments in Florida Territory
Bermuda Triangle
Cities in Florida
Cities in Miami-Dade County, Florida
Cities in Miami metropolitan area
County seats in Florida
Populated coastal places in Florida on the Atlantic Ocean
Populated places established in 1825
Port cities and towns of the Florida Atlantic coast
Seaside resorts in Florida